Innocence and Experience is a compilation album by the Blake Babies, released in 1993 (see 1993 in music). The title is a reference to the William Blake collection of poems Songs of Innocence and of Experience.

Track listing

"Wipe It Up" - 2.59
"Rain [Demo]" - 3.51
"Boiled Potato" - 2.33
"Lament" - 3.30
"Cesspool" - 3.17
"You Don't Give Up" - 3.43
"Star [Demo]" - 2.52
"Sanctify" - 4.58
"Out There" - 2.49
"Girl In A Box" - 2.40
"I'm Not Your Mother" - 3.14
"Temptation Eyes" - 2.59
"Downtime" - 3.13
"Over And Over [Live]" - 3.52

Personnel
Juliana Hatfield - vocals, guitars, bass, piano and keyboards
John Strohm - vocals, guitars, bass and keyboards
Freda Love Smith - vocals and drums

References

Blake Babies albums
1993 albums